The fondouk of the French is a caravanserai located in the medina of Tunis in the old franc1 district. It is near Bab El Bhar.

History 

The fondouk was built during the years 1659-1660 under the reign of Hammouda Pasha Bey. This fondouk is inspired by the local civil architecture of the seventeenth century.

The fondouk of the merchants is classified as a historical monument since 1922.

Medina of Tunis